In physics, the Landau–Lifshitz–Gilbert equation, named for Lev Landau, Evgeny Lifshitz, and T. L. Gilbert, is a name used for a differential equation describing the precessional motion of  magnetization  in a solid. It is a modification by Gilbert of the original equation of Landau and Lifshitz.

The various forms of the equation are commonly used in micromagnetics to model the effects of a magnetic field on ferromagnetic materials. In particular it can be used to model the time domain behavior of magnetic elements due to a magnetic field. An additional term was added to the equation to describe the effect of spin polarized current on magnets.

Landau–Lifshitz equation

In a ferromagnet, the magnetization  can vary internally but at each point its magnitude is equal to the saturation magnetization . The Landau–Lifshitz–Gilbert equation predicts the rotation of the magnetization in response to torques. An earlier, but equivalent, equation (the Landau–Lifshitz equation) was introduced by :

where  is a dimensionless constant called the damping factor. The effective field  is a combination of the external magnetic field, the demagnetizing field (magnetic field due to the magnetization), and some quantum mechanical effects. To solve this equation, additional equations for the demagnetizing field must be included.

Using the methods of irreversible statistical mechanics, numerous authors have independently obtained the Landau–Lifshitz equation.

Landau–Lifshitz–Gilbert equation
In 1955  Gilbert replaced the damping term in the Landau–Lifshitz (LL) equation by one that depends on the time derivative of the magnetization:

This is the Landau–Lifshitz–Gilbert (LLG) equation, where  is the damping parameter, which is characteristic of the material. It can be transformed into the Landau–Lifshitz equation:

where

In this form of the LL equation, the precessional term  depends on the damping term. This better represents the behavior of real ferromagnets when the damping is large.

Landau–Lifshitz–Gilbert–Slonczewski equation
In 1996 Slonczewski expanded the model to account for the spin-transfer torque, i.e. the torque induced upon the magnetization by spin-polarized current flowing through the ferromagnet.  This is commonly written in terms of the unit moment defined by :

References and footnotes

Further reading

   This is only an abstract; the full report is "Armor Research Foundation Project No. A059, Supplementary Report, May 1, 1956", but was never published. A description of the work is given in

External links 
 Magnetization dynamics applet

Magnetic ordering
Partial differential equations
Equations of physics
Lev Landau